The High Commissioner of the United Kingdom to Guyana is the United Kingdom's foremost diplomatic representative in the Republic of Guyana.

The UK's High Commissioner to Guyana has also been non-resident British Ambassador to Suriname since that country gained its independence on 25 November 1975.

List of heads of mission

High Commissioners to Guyana

1966–1967: Timothy Crosthwait
1967–1970: Kenneth Ritchie
1970–1975: William Bates
1975–1978: Peter Gautrey
1978–1982: Philip Mallet
1982–1985: William Slatcher
1985–1987: John Dudley Massingham
1987–1990: David Small
1990–1993: Douglas Gordon
1993–1998: David Johnson
1998: Ian Whitehead
1998–2002: Edward Glover
2002–2006: Stephen Hiscock
2006–2010: Fraser Wheeler
2011–2015: Andrew Ayre

2015–2021: Greg Quinn
2021-Present: Jane Miller

See also 

 List of Guyanese High Commissioners to the United Kingdom

References

External links

British High Commission in Guyana

Guyana
United Kingdom
United Kingdom High Commissioners
United Kingdom High Commissioners
United Kingdom